The third season of The Unit started on September 25, 2007, with a hiatus, which ended in the season being cut short, occurring after the 11th episode due to 2007–08 Writers Guild of America strike.

Cast and characters

Main cast 
 Dennis Haysbert as Sergeant Major Jonas Blane, a.k.a. Snake Doctor
 Scott Foley as Staff Sergeant Bob Brown, a.k.a. Cool Breeze
 Max Martini as Master Sergeant Mack Gerhardt, a.k.a. Dirt Diver
 Michael Irby as Sergeant First Class Charles Grey, a.k.a. Betty Blue
 Robert Patrick as Colonel Thomas Ryan, a.k.a. Dog Patch
 Demore Barnes as Sergeant First Class Hector Williams, a.k.a. Hammerhead

Supporting cast 
 Regina Taylor as Molly Blane
 Audrey Marie Anderson as Kim Brown
 Abby Brammell as Tiffy Gerhardt
 Rebecca Pidgeon as Charlotte Ryan
 Kavita Patil as Sergeant Kayla Medawar

Recurring cast 
 Susan Matus as Sergeant Sarah Irvine
 Angel Wainwright as Betsy Blane
 Alyssa Shafer as Serena Brown

Episodes

Notes

References

External links 
 
 

2007 American television seasons
The Unit seasons